WD repeat domain phosphoinositide-interacting protein 2 is a protein that in humans is encoded by the WIPI2 gene.

Function 

WD40 repeat proteins are key components of many essential biologic functions. They regulate the assembly of multiprotein complexes by presenting a beta-propeller platform for simultaneous and reversible protein-protein interactions. Members of the WIPI subfamily of WD40 repeat proteins, such as WIPI2, have a 7-bladed propeller structure and contain a conserved motif for interaction with phospholipids.

WIPI2 is the mammalian homolog of Atg18, not Atg21, along with the closely related protein, WIPI1. WIPI2 mRNA is readily detectable in several commonly used laboratory cell lines (HEK293A, HeLa, A431) and several cancer cell lines, while WIPI1 expression is limited to cancer cells  (but is also detected in many human tissues).

The Atg proteins regulate autophagy, which is a lysosomal degradation pathway required for maintaining cell health, surviving periods of nutrient deprivation and also plays a role in cancer, neurodegeneration and immune responses to a diverse range of pathogens. WIPI2 is recruited early to the forming autophagosome, along with DFCP-1, ULK-1 and Atg16, where it positively regulates the lipidation of Atg8 (LC3). This is not true for WIPI1.

See also 
 WIPI protein family

References

 *

Further reading